Koiak 29 - Coptic Calendar - Tobi 1

The thirtieth day of the Coptic month of Koiak, the fourth month of the Coptic year. On a common year, this day corresponds to December 26, of the Julian Calendar, and January 8, of the Gregorian Calendar. This day falls in the Coptic season of Peret, the season of emergence. This is the second day of the celebrations of the Feast of the Nativity.

Commemorations

Feasts 

 Second Day of the Feast of the Nativity

Saints 

 The martyrdom of Saint Michael, of Toukh, the Hegumen 
 The martyrdom of Zacharias the Child, and his companions in Akhmeem 
 The departure of Saint John, the Hegumen of Scetis

Other commemorations 

 The adoration of the Wisemen for the Savior

References 

Days of the Coptic calendar